is a former Japanese football player. He last played for FC Osaka.

Career
After a long career with Vissel Kobe, Mito HollyHock and lastly FC Osaka, Kondo announced his retirement in January 2018.

Club statistics
Updated to 20 February 2018.

References

External links
Profile at FC Osaka

1981 births
Living people
Osaka University of Health and Sport Sciences alumni
Biwako Seikei Sport College alumni
People from Toyokawa, Aichi
Association football people from Aichi Prefecture
Japanese footballers
J1 League players
J2 League players
Japan Football League players
Vissel Kobe players
Mito HollyHock players
FC Osaka players
Association football defenders